The APRA Silver Scroll Awards for Most Performed New Zealand Work in New Zealand and Most Performed New Zealand Work Internationally were two annual awards presented to the New Zealand song that had been performed the most in New Zealand and internationally, respectively. The awards were presented by APRA AMCOS New Zealand, the copyright collective representing New Zealand composers, lyricists and music publishers. The awards were presented annually at the APRA Silver Scroll Awards. The award was last presented in 2015.

While the national award was highly contested, from 2000 to 2012 the international award was dominated by Crowded House's 1986 song "Don't Dream It's Over".

Most Performed New Zealand Work in New Zealand 

The Most Performed New Zealand Work in New Zealand winner is determined by APRA NZ, using data provided by New Zealand television and radio. The award covers the period of 1 July to 30 June each year. At least 50% of the song must have been written by an APRA New Zealand member.

Most Performed New Zealand Work Overseas 

The winners of Most Performed New Zealand Work Overseas are decided by APRA NZ, based on international performance activity.

References 

 
New Zealand music awards
Awards established in 1994
1994 establishments in New Zealand